Georgetown is a census-designated place (CDP) in Chatham County, Georgia, United States. The population was 11,916 at the 2020 U.S. Census. Georgetown lies across the Little Ogeechee River (and city limits) from Savannah, Georgia, and is a suburban "bedroom community" of Savannah, where most of its adult residents work. It is part of the Savannah Metropolitan Statistical Area.

Georgetown was constructed mostly in the late 1970s and early 1980s, but new subdivisions have been built recently. Shopping facilities are now more plentiful and continue to be added. Two schools in Georgetown are units of the Savannah-Chatham public school system: Georgetown Elementary and Southwest Middle School. Georgetown's public high school students attend Windsor Forest High School in Savannah.

Geography
It is bordered to the east, south, and west by portions of the city of Savannah and has lost area since the 2000 census due to annexations by city. To the northwest is the unincorporated community of Henderson. U.S. Route 17 forms the northwestern edge of Georgetown, and leads northeast  to downtown Savannah and southwest  to Richmond Hill. Veterans Parkway begins in the eastern part of Georgetown and also leads  to the center of Savannah.

Demographics

2020 census

As of the 2020 United States census, there were 11,916 people, 4,971 households, and 3,741 families residing in the CDP.

2000 census
As of the census of 2000, there were 10,599 people, 4,123 households, and 2,820 families residing in the CDP. The racial makeup of the CDP was 72.78% White, 19.89% African American, 0.39% Native American, 3.09% Asian, 0.07% Pacific Islander, 1.72% from other races, and 2.08% from two or more races. Hispanic or Latino of any race were 4.62% of the population.

There were 4,123 households, out of which 37.2% had children under the age of 18 living with them, 56.9% were married couples living together, 8.4% had a female householder with no husband present, and 31.6% were non-families. 22.5% of all households were made up of individuals, and 2.7% had someone living alone who was 65 years of age or older.  The average household size was 2.57 and the average family size was 3.07.

In the CDP, the population was spread out, with 27.0% under the age of 18, 10.9% from 18 to 24, 40.0% from 25 to 44, 17.4% from 45 to 64, and 4.6% who were 65 years of age or older.  The median age was 30 years. For every 100 females, there were 99.6 males.  For every 100 females age 18 and over, there were 98.3 males.

The median income for a household in the CDP was $48,393, and the median income for a family was $54,951. Males had a median income of $40,359 versus $27,160 for females. The per capita income for the CDP was $22,051.  About 2.5% of families and 5.5% of the population were below the poverty line, including 3.1% of those under age 18 and 12.9% of those age 65 or over.

Education

It is in the Savannah-Chatham County Public Schools. Schools include:
 Georgetown K-8 School

References

Census-designated places in Chatham County, Georgia
Census-designated places in Georgia (U.S. state)
Savannah metropolitan area